Plantago crypsoides is a species of annual herb in the family Plantaginaceae. They have a self-supporting growth form and simple, broad leaves.

Sources

References 

crypsoides
Flora of Malta